Antonio Greene is a retired Bahamian decathlete.

He won the gold medal at the 1989 Central American and Caribbean Championships, the bronze medal at the 1990 Central American and Caribbean Games, and finished fourth at the 1991 Pan American Games,

His personal best score was 7421 points, achieved at the 1989 Central American and Caribbean Championships in San Juan, Puerto Rico. This was the Bahamian record until 2019.

References

Year of birth missing (living people)
Living people
Bahamian decathletes
Central American and Caribbean Games bronze medalists for the Bahamas
Pan American Games competitors for the Bahamas
Athletes (track and field) at the 1991 Pan American Games
Central American and Caribbean Games medalists in athletics
Competitors at the 1990 Central American and Caribbean Games